The 2019 Royal Rumble was the 32nd annual Royal Rumble professional wrestling pay-per-view and livestreaming event produced by WWE. It was held for wrestlers from the promotion's Raw, SmackDown, and 205 Live brand divisions. The event took place on January 27, 2019, at Chase Field in Phoenix, Arizona. During the event, WWE reported there were 48,193 people in attendance.

Traditionally, the Royal Rumble match winner receives a world championship match at that year's WrestleMania. For the 2019 event, the winners of both the men's and women's matches received a choice of which championship to challenge for at WrestleMania 35. The men could choose to challenge for either Raw's Universal Championship or SmackDown's WWE Championship, while the women had the choice between the Raw Women's Championship and the SmackDown Women's Championship.

In total, ten matches were contested at the event, including three on the Kickoff pre-show. In the main event, Raw's Seth Rollins won the men's Royal Rumble match by last eliminating Braun Strowman, also from Raw, while SmackDown's Becky Lynch won the women's Royal Rumble match by lastly eliminating Charlotte Flair, also from SmackDown. In the opening bout, Lynch lost her SmackDown Women's Championship match against Asuka. Other prominent matches included Brock Lesnar retaining Raw's Universal Championship against Finn Bálor, Daniel Bryan defeating AJ Styles to retain SmackDown's WWE Championship, and Ronda Rousey defeating Sasha Banks to retain the Raw Women's Championship. The event also featured the return of Jeff Jarrett, who competed in his first WWE match since No Mercy in October 1999.

Production

Background
The Royal Rumble is an annual gimmick pay-per-view (PPV) and WWE Network event, produced every January by WWE since 1988. It is one of the promotion's original four pay-per-views, along with WrestleMania, SummerSlam, and Survivor Series, dubbed the "Big Four". It is named after the Royal Rumble match, a modified battle royal in which the participants enter at timed intervals instead of all beginning in the ring at the same time. The 2019 event was the 32nd event in the Royal Rumble chronology and was scheduled to be held on January 27, 2019, at Chase Field in Phoenix, Arizona. It featured wrestlers from the Raw, SmackDown, and 205 Live brands, with some NXT wrestlers and WWE veterans appearing in both the men's and women's Royal Rumble matches.

The Royal Rumble match generally features 30 wrestlers and the winner traditionally earns a world championship match at that year's WrestleMania. For 2019, the men and women could choose to challenge for either brand's top championship at WrestleMania 35: the men had their choice between Raw's Universal Championship or SmackDown's WWE Championship, while the women could choose either the Raw Women's Championship or the SmackDown Women's Championship.

Storylines 

The card consisted of ten matches, including three on the Kickoff pre-show. The matches resulted from scripted storylines, where wrestlers portrayed heroes, villains, or less distinguishable characters to build tension and culminated in a wrestling match or series of matches. Results were predetermined by WWE's writers on the Raw, SmackDown, and 205 Live brands, with storylines produced on their weekly television shows, Monday Night Raw, SmackDown Live, and the cruiserweight-exclusive 205 Live.

At TLC: Tables, Ladders & Chairs, Fabulous Truth (Carmella and R-Truth) defeated Mahalicia (Alicia Fox and Jinder Mahal) to win the second season of Mixed Match Challenge. Their prize for winning was each getting the #30 spot in their respective Royal Rumble matches at the pay-per-view. In the weeks following TLC, multiple wrestlers were announced for both Rumble matches.

At Crown Jewel, Brock Lesnar defeated Braun Strowman to regain the then-vacant Universal Championship, thanks in part to then-Acting Raw General Manager Baron Corbin. At TLC, Strowman defeated Corbin in a Tables, Ladders, and Chairs match, thus stripping Corbin of his authoritative power and earning a Universal Championship match against Lesnar at the Royal Rumble. On the January 14 episode of Raw, Corbin confronted Strowman and insulted him, leading to a chase to the parking area where Corbin hid in a limousine. Strowman shattered the glass and broke the door off, only for WWE Chairman Vince McMahon to appear, revealing that was his limo. Mr. McMahon then fined Strowman $100,000. Strowman then argued with Mr. McMahon, who then cancelled his match with Lesnar. An angry Strowman proceeded to flip over the limo. Later that night, John Cena, Drew McIntyre, Corbin, and Finn Bálor expressed their interests in facing Lesnar at the Royal Rumble. Mr. McMahon scheduled a fatal four-way match where the winner would face Lesnar, which Bálor won after defending his spot earlier in the night against Jinder Mahal. Due to this, Bálor was subsequently removed from the Royal Rumble match.

At TLC, Daniel Bryan defeated AJ Styles to retain the WWE Championship. On the January 1, 2019 episode of SmackDown, Styles earned another opportunity against Bryan at the Royal Rumble by defeating Randy Orton, Mustafa Ali, Rey Mysterio, and Samoa Joe in a fatal five-way match.

At TLC, Asuka defeated Becky Lynch and Charlotte Flair in a triple threat Tables, Ladders, and Chairs match to win the SmackDown Women's Championship. Following the event, The McMahon Family (Vince McMahon, Shane McMahon, Stephanie McMahon, and Triple H) decreed that champions would no longer have automatic rematch clauses, ruling Lynch out of a guaranteed rematch. After she, Flair, and Carmella all pleaded their cases for why they deserved a title opportunity on the January 1, 2019 episode of SmackDown, WWE Chief Operating Officer Triple H scheduled a triple threat match between the three for the following week to determine Asuka's challenger at the Royal Rumble, which was won by Lynch.

At TLC, Ronda Rousey retained the Raw Women's Championship against Nia Jax. On the January 7, 2019 episode of Raw, Rousey appeared on Alexa Bliss' interview segment, "A Moment of Bliss", and stated that she wanted to face Sasha Banks next, believing Banks to be a true test of her abilities. Jax interrupted, wanting a rematch against Rousey. Banks then came out and challenged Jax to a match in which the winner would face Rousey for the Raw Women's Championship at the Royal Rumble, which Banks won.

At Crown Jewel, Shane McMahon won the WWE World Cup, replacing The Miz in the finals, who was deemed unable to compete due to a pre-match brawl. Following this, The Miz began a pursuit to form a tag team with Shane, claiming that they could be the best tag team in the world. Shane finally agreed to the pairing, and on the January 8, 2019 episode of SmackDown, Miz challenged The Bar (Cesaro and Sheamus) for the SmackDown Tag Team Championship at the Royal Rumble, and The Bar accepted.

On the TLC Kickoff pre-show, Buddy Murphy retained the WWE Cruiserweight Championship against Cedric Alexander. On the December 26, 2018 episode of 205 Live, General Manager Drake Maverick scheduled Murphy to defend the title at the Royal Rumble in a fatal four-way match with his opponents to be decided in qualifying matches. The following week, Kalisto and Akira Tozawa qualified for the match by defeating Lio Rush and Drew Gulak, respectively. Hideo Itami won the final spot by defeating Alexander. The match was scheduled for the Royal Rumble Kickoff pre-show.

On the December 25, 2018 episode of SmackDown, Rusev defeated Shinsuke Nakamura to win the United States Championship. On the January 1, 2019 episode, while Rusev and his wife/manager Lana were celebrating the title win, Nakamura attacked Rusev with Lana also getting hurt in the scuffle. On the January 15 episode, Rusev was scheduled to defend the title against Nakamura on the Royal Rumble Kickoff pre-show.

Event

Pre-show 
Three matches were contested on the Royal Rumble Kickoff pre-show. In the first match, AOP manager Drake Maverick announced a tag team match between Raw Tag Team Champions Bobby Roode and Chad Gable and the team of Scott Dawson (of The Revival) and Rezar (of AOP), with both The Revival and AOP receiving a Raw Tag Team Championship match if they won. In the end, Roode and Gable performed a moonsault/neckbreaker combo on Dawson to win the match.

Next, Rusev defended the United States Championship against Shinsuke Nakamura. In the climax, Rusev's wife Lana stood on the ring apron to notify the referee of Nakamura removing the turnbuckle, which led to Nakamura staring her down. As Rusev attacked Nakamura, he accidentally knocked down his wife. Distracted, Nakamura took advantage and attacked Rusev with the "Kinshasa" to win the title for a second time.

The final match on the pre-show was the fatal four-way match in which Buddy Murphy defended the WWE Cruiserweight Championship against Akira Tozawa, Hideo Itami, and Kalisto. In the climax, Murphy performed "Murphy's Law" on Itami to retain the title.

Preliminary matches 
The actual pay-per-view opened with Asuka defending the SmackDown Women's Championship against Becky Lynch. The climax saw Asuka counter a "Dis-Arm-Her" from Lynch into an inverted "Asuka Lock", which caused Lynch to submit and allowed Asuka to retain her championship.

In the second match, The Bar (Cesaro and Sheamus) defended the SmackDown Tag Team Championship against The Miz and Shane McMahon. In the end, Sheamus inadvertently performed a "Brogue Kick" on Cesaro, before Miz performed a "Skull-Crushing Finale" on Sheamus. Shane then performed a shooting star press on Cesaro to win the titles.

Next, Ronda Rousey defended the Raw Women's Championship against Sasha Banks. During the match, Rousey attempted a forearm on Banks, who moved out of the way, causing it to crash into the ring post. Banks then focused on further weakening the arm. Later, Banks performed a "suicide dive" on Rousey, who caught her and applied an "armbar" on Banks, who submitted, but since it was outside of the ring, the match continued. In the climax, Banks applied the "Bank Statement". Rousey tried to make it to the bottom rope, but Banks transitioned into a crucifix pin for a nearfall and applied a "Fujiwara armbar". Rousey escaped the submission and followed up with a gutwrench powerbomb and "Piper's Pit" on Banks, giving Rousey her first pinfall victory in the WWE and thus retaining the title.

The fourth match was the 30-woman Royal Rumble match for a women's championship match at WrestleMania 35. Lacey Evans, making her main roster debut, and Natalya began the match. Natalya applied a sharpshooter on Evans and Mandy Rose (entrant #3) at the same time before Liv Morgan entered at #4. She was quickly eliminated by Natalya in eight seconds. NXT's Xia Li, Kairi Sane, Candice LeRae, Kacy Catanzaro, Io Shirai, NXT UK's Rhea Ripley were all surprise entrants at #11, #14, #17, #19, #23 and #24 respectively. After Naomi (entrant #16) eliminated Rose, she leapt from the ring barricade onto the steel steps, only for Rose to pull her off the apron and eliminate her. Catanzaro had another save from elimination, walking on her hands to the ring post, but was eliminated by Ripley. The match also saw an appearance by Hornswoggle, who aided in the elimination of Zelina Vega (entrant #20). Lana was scheduled to enter the match at number 28 but still suffered from her injury from the pre-show. Afterwards, Nia Jax (entrant #29) attacked Lana, rendering her unable to compete. Jax would go on to eliminate Shirai, Natalya (who lasted the longest in a women's Royal Rumble match at 56 minutes until it was surpassed by Bianca Belair in 2021), and Bayley (entrant #27). After Carmella entered at #30, Becky Lynch appeared and replaced Lana in the match. In the climax, Lynch (who was outside of the ring, though not eliminated) eliminated Jax, bringing the final two to Lynch and Flair. Jax shoved Lynch off the steps, giving her a (storyline) knee injury. After a short battle between Flair and Lynch, Flair attempted a Big Boot, but Lynch countered and sent Flair over the top rope. Lynch then performed a clothesline on Flair, who rolled out of the ring and was eliminated. As a result, Lynch won the women's Royal Rumble Match.

After that, Daniel Bryan defended the WWE Championship against AJ Styles. In the climax, a returning Rowan appeared. Bryan then accidentally performed an enzuigiri on the referee. Styles performed a "Styles Clash" on Bryan but Rowan performed a Clawhold Slam on Styles. Bryan then pinned Styles to retain the title.

In the penultimate match, Brock Lesnar defended the Universal Championship against Finn Bálor. Bálor quickly took to the offense. In the climax, Bálor performed the "Coup de Grâce" on Lesnar, but Lesnar kicked out and immediately applied a kimura lock on Bálor, who submitted, to retain the title. After the match, Lesnar performed three German suplexes and an "F-5" on Bálor.

Main event
The main event was the 30-man Royal Rumble match for a world championship match at WrestleMania 35. Elias began the match at number one and was interrupted by WWE Hall of Famer Jeff Jarrett, entering the match at number 2. Elias bashed a guitar on Jarrett before eliminating him. NXT North American Champion Johnny Gargano, WWE United Kingdom Champion Pete Dunne and Aleister Black were surprise entrants at #6, #18 and #21 respectively. Curt Hawkins (entrant #9) was knocked out by Samoa Joe (entrant #8), but went underneath the ring. Titus O'Neil (entrant #11) did not trip underneath the ring, like he did at the Greatest Royal Rumble. However, O'Neil chased Hawkins underneath the ring and back inside where Hawkins eliminated O'Neil, only to be eliminated by Joe. No Way Jose was quickly eliminated by Joe in two seconds. Kofi Kingston (entrant #12) saved himself from elimination two separate times, but was eliminated alongside Xavier Woods (entrant #17) by Drew McIntyre (entrant #16). Bobby Lashley (entrant #26) was quickly eliminated by Seth Rollins (entrant #10) in eleven seconds, and performed a spinebuster on Rollins through an announce table before Braun Strowman entered at #27. As #30 entrant R-Truth made his entrance, he was attacked by Nia Jax, who took his spot and eliminated Mustafa Ali. Jax then received a superkick from Dolph Ziggler, a "619" from Rey Mysterio, and an "RKO" from Randy Orton before being eliminated by Mysterio. Jax became the fourth woman to enter a men's Royal Rumble match, the first person to compete in both the men's and women's Royal Rumble matches in the same night, and the first to score eliminations in both matches. In the end, Rollins and Strowman battled on the ring apron, which ended when Rollins performed a Stomp on Strowman, eliminating him from the match. As a result, Rollins won the men's Royal Rumble match.

Aftermath

Raw

The following night on Raw, Raw Women's Champion Ronda Rousey issued an open challenge that was answered by Bayley. After retaining, women's Royal Rumble match winner Becky Lynch made her entrance and confronted Rousey. After recapping their rivalry that began at Survivor Series, Lynch chose to face Rousey for the Raw Women's Championship at WrestleMania 35.

Seth Rollins celebrated his Royal Rumble match victory. Triple H then came out and congratulated him, but said that Rollins needed to choose which champion he wanted to face at WrestleMania 35 by the end of the night. Backstage, Braun Strowman, the runner up in the Royal Rumble match, confronted Rollins and told him he "earned it", and to "make the right decision". Later, Rollins confronted Brock Lesnar. After an ensuing brawl, Rollins chose to face Lesnar for the Universal Championship at WrestleMania 35.

Finn Bálor addressed his loss to Brock Lesnar, but stated that he made Lesnar believe that Bálor could win. Bálor was then confronted by Intercontinental Champion Bobby Lashley and his manager Lio Rush, and Lashley attacked Bálor.

SmackDown
On the following SmackDown, Becky Lynch addressed how everything had changed for her since winning the women's Royal Rumble match. Charlotte Flair then came out and congratulated Lynch and stated that although Lynch won, she was never truly in the match in the first place, and that Lynch would not be where she was at if it were not for Flair. An ensuing brawl broke out between Flair and Lynch until referees separated them.

As compensation for not being able to compete in the men's Royal Rumble match, R-Truth was granted a United States Championship match against new champion Shinsuke Nakamura. Truth defeated Nakamura to win the title, which led to Rusev coming out and declaring that Truth was not worthy of the title. Rusev then challenged Truth for the title, but was also defeated. After the match, Rusev turned heel and, along with Nakamura, attacked Truth.

Daniel Bryan, along with his new ally Rowan, revealed a new custom WWE Championship belt, made from hemp and wood. He was then interrupted by AJ Styles, which prompted Jeff Hardy, Samoa Joe, Randy Orton, and Mustafa Ali to come out and challenge Bryan for the title. After an ensuing brawl, Triple H announced that Bryan would defend the title against the five at the Elimination Chamber pay-per-view inside the Elimination Chamber. Ali, however, was replaced by Kofi Kingston after suffering an injury.

New SmackDown Tag Team Champions The Miz and Shane McMahon celebrated their title win along with Miz's father. Later that night, The Usos defeated Heavy Machinery (Otis Dozovic and Tucker Knight), The Bar (Sheamus and Cesaro), and The New Day (represented by Big E and Kofi Kingston) to become the number one contenders for the titles at Elimination Chamber.

205 Live
This would be the only Royal Rumble to include the 205 Live brand, as in September, 205 Live merged under NXT. Also at that time, NXT was elevated to WWE's third main brand, and its championships, the NXT Championship and NXT Women's Championship, became eligible choices for the Rumble winners at future events.

Results

Women's Royal Rumble match entrances and eliminations

 – Raw
 – SmackDown
 – NXT
 – NXT UK
 – 205Live
 - Unbranded
 – Winner

(*) - Mandy Rose was already eliminated when she eliminated Naomi.

(**) - Lana came out as the #28 entrant, but a storyline ankle injury suffered on the pre-show kept her from competing. Becky Lynch was allowed to take her spot.

Men's Royal Rumble match entrances and eliminations

 – Raw
 – SmackDown
 – NXT
 – NXT UK
 - Unbranded
 – Hall of Famer (HOF)
 – Winner

(*) - Nia Jax attacked the #30 entrant, R-Truth, and took his spot.

Notes

References

External links
 

2019
2019 WWE pay-per-view events
2019 WWE Network events
2019 in Arizona
Professional wrestling in Phoenix, Arizona
Events in Phoenix, Arizona
January 2019 events in the United States